TID or tid may refer to:

 Thermionic Detector, a detector used in gas chromatography based on the principle of ionization and measuring a change in electron flux
 Total Ionizing Dose (related to ionizing radiation)
 Transient ischemic dilation, a finding on a nuclear cardiology test consistent with coronary artery disease
 TID class tug, a British tugboat design of World War II
 TID (musician) - a musician from Tanzania
 Traffic Identifier - an identifier used for traffic flows in 802.11 Wireless LAN
ter in die, Latin for three times daily; usually refers to prescription medication dosage (e.g. TID)
 Tag identification memory, in a Gen 2 RFID tag, this consists of memory about the tag itself, such as the tag ID
 Transportation improvement district
 Travelling Ionospheric Disturbance - A type of Ionospheric perturbation
 Truncated dodecahedron
 Travel Itinerary Directory
 Tobacco Induced Diseases - a peer reviewed journal